Nature Canada is a member-based environmental organization headquartered in Ottawa, Ontario. Its supporters include more than 100,000 individuals and over 800 affiliated organizations, including local and provincial naturalist clubs.

The organization's mission is to “protect and conserve wildlife and habitats in Canada by engaging people and advocating on behalf of nature.” Their conservation work is based predominantly on community-based efforts to protect animals, plants and habitat, lobbying for legislation at the federal level to protect endangered species and habitats, and working as a Canadian co-partner for BirdLife International's Important Bird Area (IBA) program.

History

Nature Canada traces its roots back to September 30, 1939, when Reginald Whittemore launched the magazine Canadian Nature in honour of his late wife, Mabel Frances Whittemore. The organization claims this makes Nature Canada the oldest national nature conservation charity in Canada, however Ducks Unlimited Canada was founded two years earlier in 1937

In 1948, the organization established itself as the Audubon Society of Canada.

In 1971, the Audubon Society of Canada expanded its mandate beyond bird conservation and re-established itself as the Canadian Nature Federation (CNF).

In 2004, the CNF changed its name to simply Nature Canada.

Program areas

Nature Canada's work focuses on:

 Protected Areas — Canada made a promise to protect at least 17% of land and inland water and 10% of coastal and marine areas by 2020.
 NatureHood — an urban nature program seeking to connect Canadians living in cities to nature nearby to them. The initial NatureHood pilot project is based in Ottawa, Ontario and Gatineau, Quebec.
 NatureNetwork – the term Nature Canada uses for its network of local Canadian naturalist organizations as well as its provincial affiliates in every province.

Nature Canada formerly published a magazine, Canadian Nature, however it discontinued publication in 2004, after 65 years. The organization produces teacher guides, technical reports, media releases, brochures, information packages and an e-newsletter.

See also
 Ontario Nature
 Bird Studies Canada
 BirdLife International
 International Union for Conservation of Nature

References

External links 
Nature Canada

Charities based in Canada
Nature conservation organizations based in Canada
Organizations based in Ottawa
Environmental organizations based in Ontario
Organizations established in 1939
1939 establishments in Ontario
Animal welfare organizations based in Canada